ITNEA or Information and TMT Non-Executives' Association was founded in 1999 by David Tebbs and is the United Kingdom association for non-executive Directors (NEDs) and non-executive Chairmen of listed IT, telecommunications and related media companies. They are sometimes referred to as telecommunication, media and technology (TMT), or information and  computing technology (ICT) companies .

ITNEA background
ITNEA has over 500 members, holding over 1000 directorships between them. These directorships range from private start-ups to FTSE 100 companies, in all sectors, both UK and international. The common thread is that to qualify for membership, they must hold a non-executive directorship or Chairmanship of a quoted technology company (or an executive directorship of such where the person has or wants a non-executive role as well). ITNEA was founded by David Tebbs in 1998.

Objectives 
Act as a networking forum for non-executive directors and chairmen, giving them the opportunity to meet and discuss the particular issues faced in these roles with others in similar positions.
Draw to members' attention important lobbying opportunities, where issues that will affect them or their companies are under review.
Provide members with information on non executive director and chairman appointments through an advertising service open to companies and their advisors and agents. Advertising service open to companies and their advisors and agents.

Activity
The members meet several times per year often with a guest speaker covering a topic of importance to members. Meetings are structured to facilitate member networking.  Past speakers have included: the e-Envoy, The Director General of the CBI, a remuneration and share option consultant, fund managers, the Director General of the IoD, financial analysts, a Chairman of an FTSE 100 company, venture capitalists, a leading M&A advisor, legal specialists and others.  Members are occasionally invited to attend functions with a wider audience, arranged by our sponsors or others.

External links
ITNEA official web site

Telecommunications organizations